The LMS Emmy Noether Fellowship is a fellowship awarded by the London Mathematical Society.

"The fellowships are designed to enhance the mathematical sciences research, broadly construed, of holders either re-establishing their research programme after returning from a major break associated with caring responsibilities or those requiring support to maintain their research programme while dealing with significant ongoing caring responsibilities.

The fellowship is named after the German mathematician Emmy Noether.

Winners
The winners of the LMS Emmy Noether Fellowship have been:

 2020 - Dr Milena Hering, University of Edinburgh 
2020 - Dr Anne-Sophie Kaloghiros, Brunel University 
2020 - Dr Irene Kyza, University of Dundee 
2020 - Dr Cristina Manolache, University of Sheffield

References

Awards of the London Mathematical Society